The Institute of Transport Administration (IoTA) is an international professional association for individuals who work in transport management (traffic management), including  road, rail, sea and air.  Founded in 1944, it was previously known as The Institute of Traffic Administration.

Headquartered in Westoning, United Kingdom, the IoTA operates centres in the United Kingdom, Hong Kong and Nigeria.   It is recognised by the UK Department for Transport and the Traffic Commissioners.

History 
The IoTA was founded in 1944 as The Institute of Traffic Administration . It was registered as a Friendly Society on 25 July 1944  under society number 53SA.

On 29 January 1981 the IoTA  renamed itself as The Institute of Transport Administration. In 1977,  the UK Secretary of State for Transport designated the Institute as an "Approved Body" under the Public Service Vehicle Operators (Qualifications) Regulations 1977  and Goods Vehicle Operators (Qualifications) Regulations 1977, This enabled the IoTA to issue CPC Exemption Certificates to Corporate Members engaged in road transport operations.

With effect from 5 December 2011 "Approved Body" status was withdrawn from all organisations holding it. Exemption Certificates issued by the IoTA before that date continue to be valid though.

Governance

Trustees 

The IoTA's property is held by a body of Trustees. There may be no fewer than three nor more than five them. They must stand for re-election annually and have the right to attend meetings of the National Council, Executive Committee and any of the Institute's National Committees. At any IoTA meeting the Trustees have a single vote as a collective body.

National Council 

The Council directs and controls all the activities of the IoTA, and may frame, amend, alter and revoke any and all bye-laws and standing orders. It consists of representatives elected from the corporate members of each approved Centre. Each centre elects two representatives to serve for a maximum of three years, only one of whom is entitled to vote.

The Council acts through an Executive Committee consisting of six office holders and the IoTA's Director, and three National Committees consisting of a chairman and four other members. The Executive Committee and all of the National Committees have the power of co-option.

Executive committee 

This committee comprises the National Chairman, Deputy President and Chairmen (or nominated deputies) of the National Committees. The Director and President are ex-officio members. Like the National Committees it has the power of co-option.

The committee makes all urgent decisions between Council meetings, within the policies outlined by the National Council.  A full report of these is submitted to Council at its next meeting.

Finance and General Purposes Committee 

The Committee considers all questions relating to finance and the administration of the IoTA. it is responsible to National Council. The Committee must ensure that the financial management is carried out in accordance with recognised accounting practice and the IoTA Rules.  The Committee is responsible for creating an annual budget..

The Committee examines the audited accounts and grant applications from Centres each year, approves and advises Centres of annual grant awards, determines the salary levels of all paid officers and staff.. It also presents an annual recommendation to the National Council concerning subscription levels for the forthcoming year.

This Committee is responsible for updating the IoTA Rules of the IoTA and Centre Handbook are kept up with proposed amendments going to the Executive Councile

External Affairs Committee 

The committee considers all transport industry topics that would interest the IoTA and Its membership. The Committee performs public relations activities for IoTA.

The Committee also publishes the IoTAs Official Journal and an updates the IoTA website. It also advises National Council and the Centres on all public relations concerns. Liaison Officers for both Scotland and Wales are co-opted members of this committee.

Education, Training and Membership Committee 

The Committee works to increase IoTA membership.  It is responsible for keeping abreast of educational developments and assessing their effects upon the educational and training needs of IoTA members.  The Committee works with the Director in developing and promoting an education and training policy..

This committee is responsible for overseeing the IoTA's Operator Licensing Awareness Training (OLAT), Transport Managers Refresher (TMR), Fleet Accreditation Scheme (FAS) as well as the Certificate in Transport Management (CTM).

President, Deputy President and Director 

The positions of President and Deputy-President are held by elected senior Members or Fellows of IoTA. These posts are largely ceremonial, although the President acts as chairman of the Executive Committee.

The Institute employs a salaried Director to administer its day-to-day activities.

Past Presidents and Deputy Presidents

Centres 

The IoTA operates Centres throughout the United Kingdom and in several other countries..

IoTA (UK) 

The present list of Centres is East Anglia; Essex; Herts, Beds & Bucks; Leicester; Lancashire; London Central; Peterborough; Manchester; Cheshire, Mersey & North Wales; West Midlands; North East; Scotland; South East; South Wales; Solent; Wessex and Yorkshire.

Whilst members are normally assigned to a Centre which is related to their home or work postcode, every member has the choice of which Centre he/she wishes to be associated with. Some members prefer to be "unattached".

IoTA (Hong Kong) 

IoTA (Hong Kong) is an Affiliate Centre with approximately 45 members. The Centre operates as an autonomous body.

IoTA (Nigeria) 

IoTA (Nigeria) is an Affiliate Centre with approx. 3,000 members. The Centre operates as an autonomous body and is approved by the Nigerian Federal Ministry of Transport as an education and awarding body.

IoTA (Overseas) 

The IoTA has members in Switzerland, Germany, Sri Lanka, Thailand, Tanzania, America and Australia.

External links 
UK Department for Transport
 Traffic Commissioners

References 

Transport Administration